Weitz is a German surname. Notable people with the surname include:

 Brian Weitz (born 1979), American musician
 Bruce Weitz (born 1943), American actor
 Chris Weitz (born 1969), Academy Award nominated producer, writer and director
 David A. Weitz (born 1951), American physicist
 Eduard Weitz (born 1946), Israeli Olympic weightlifter
 Jeffrey Weitz, contemporary Canadian biochemist
 John Weitz, (1923–2002), American fashion designer, historian and novelist
 Julie Weitz (born 1979), American virtual artist
 Kristine Weitz (born 1962), American singer and songwriter
 Margaret Weitz (born 1929), American cultural scientist
 Mark Weitz (born 1945), keyboard player
 Morris Weitz (1916-1981), American aesthetician
 Paul J. Weitz (1932–2017), American astronaut
 Paul Weitz (filmmaker) (born 1965), American filmmaker
 Perry Weitz, contemporary American lawyer
 Yechiam Weitz (born 1951), Israeli historian
 Yosef Weitz (1890–1972), director of the Land and Afforestation Department of the Jewish National Fund

See also
 The Weitz Company, American engineering firm
Waitz
 Weiz
 Whites

German-language surnames
Jewish surnames